Panchali Sabatham is a Tamil epic by the poet Subramania Bharati. The poem retells the events of the episode of the game of dice from the Mahabharata. Bharati uses the incidents from the Mahabharata to draw parallels with the Kurukshetra War and the Indian War of Independence and Panchali (Draupadi) with Bharata Mata.

It is popularly known for emphasizing liberation of women from oppression and remains as one of the well known feminist works in Tamil literature.

Structure 
Panchali Sabatham is divided into two major parts and is further sub-divided into five sarukkam (chapter) namely,

 சூழ்ச்சிசருக்கம் (Suḻcchi-carukkam) - Plotting Chapter
 சூதாட்டச்சருக்கம் (Suudhatta-carukkam) - Gambling Chapter
 அடிமைச்சருக்கம் (Adimai-carukkam) - Slavery Chapter
 துகிலுரிதல் சருக்கம் (Thugilurithal Sarukkam) - Harassment Chapter
 சபதச்சருக்கம் (Sabatha-carukkam) - Vow Chapter.

The epic contains a total of 412 poems. It is written in 'pa' meter called 'sindhu'.

References 

Indian poems
Tamil poetry
Feminist literature
Mahabharata